Jiang Xiaowan was the interpreter who accompanied Aurel Stein on his expedition to Dunhuang in 1907 and enabled Stein to secure the purchase of ancient manuscripts, including the Diamond Sutra, the world's oldest dated printed text.

Name 

Jiang Xiaowan was his given name. His courtesy name according to Aurel Stein was Chiang Yin-Ma; however the Chinese characters of this name was not recorded.

Ssu-yeh was a title at the time indicating the person had learned traditional Chinese law.

References

See also 

Turning the Pages - the Diamond Sutra at the British Library (broadband  or dial-up )

1922 deaths
Chinese explorers
Qing dynasty translators
People from Hunan